General Establishment of Syrian Railways (CFS) is the national railway operator for the state of Syria, subordinate to the Ministry of Transportation. It was established in 1956 and is headquartered in Aleppo. Syria's rail infrastructure has been severely compromised as a result of the ongoing conflict in the country.

History 

The first railway in Syria opened when the country was part of the Ottoman Empire, with the  gauge line from Damascus to the port city of Beirut in present-day Lebanon opened in 1895. The Hejaz railway opened in 1908 between Damascus and Medina in present-day Saudi Arabia also used  gauge. The French wanted an extension of the standard gauge railway to connect with Palestine Railways and so agreed the building of a branch line to Tripoli, Lebanon, operated by Société Ottomane du Chemin de fer Damas-Hama et prolongements, also known as DHP.

The Baghdad Railway had progressed as far as Aleppo by 1912, with the branch to Tripoli complete, by the start of World War I; and onwards to Nusaybin by October 1918. The Turks, who sided with Germany and the Central Powers, decided to recover the infrastructure south of Aleppo to the Lebanon in 1917. The Baghdad Railway created opportunity and problems for both sides, being unfinished but running just south of the then defined Syrian/Turkish border.
Post war, the border was redrawn, and the railway was now north of the border. DHP reinstated the Tripoli line by 1921. From 1922 the Baghdad Railway was worked in succession by two French companies, who were liquidated in 1933 when the border was again redrawn, placing the Baghdad Railway section again in Syrian control. Lignes Syriennes de Baghdad (LSB) took over operations, a subsidiary of DHP.

The next big developments in Syrian railways were due to the political manoeuvering leading up to and during World War II. As Turkey had sided with Germany in World War One, the Allies were concerned with poor transport in the area, and their ability to bring force on the Turks. 
Having built railways extensions in both the Eastern and Western deserts of Egypt, they initially operated services via the Hejaz Railway, but were frustrated by the need to transload goods due to the gauge break. They surveyed a route from Haifa to Rayak in 1941, but decided there were too many construction difficulties. The standard gauge line from Beirut to Haifa was eventually built by Commonwealth military engineers from South Africa and Oceania during WWII, in part supplied by a  gauge railway to access materials. Ultimately, Turkey remained neutral and refused the Allies access to their jointly controlled sections of the Baghdad Railway, although by then the Allies had extended Palestine Railways' line from Beirut along the Lebanese coast, crossing into Syria near Al Akkari and from there to Homs, Hama and onward to connect with the Baghdad Railway at Aleppo.

Locomotives servicing the Allied war effort included the British R.A. Riddles designed WD Austerity 2-10-0, four of which post war went into Syrian service, designed CFS Class 150.6.

In 1956, all railways in Syria were nationalised, and reorganised as CFS (Chemins de Fer Syriens) from 1 January 1965. Expanded with monetary and industrial assistance from the USSR, the agreement covered the joint industrial development of the country. Covering the development of the ports of Tartus and Latakia, they were initially connected by rail to Al Akkari and Aleppo in 1968 and 1975 respectively. An irrigation project on the Euphrates, resulting in the construction of the Tabqa Dam, drove the connection of Aleppo to Al-Thawrah (1968), Raqqa (1972) Deir ez Zor (1973), reaching the old Baghdad Railway at Al Qamishli in 1976.

Tramway

Current system

Network 

Today, all  network and trains are operated by CFS. Using all diesel-electric powered traction, the main routes prior to the Syrian Civil War were:
 Damascus - Homs - Hamah - Aleppo - Maydan Ikbis (- Ankara TCDD)
 Aleppo - Latakia - Tartus - Al Akkari - Homs
 Homs - Palmyra: freight only, opened for phosphates traffic, destined for the port of Tartus, in 1980
 Line runs from the oilfields of Al Qamishli in the north to the port of Latakia (750 km)
 Al Akkari (- Tripoli CEL, out of use)
 Aleppo - Deir ez-Zor - Al-Qamishli (- Nusaybin TCDD)
 Extension from Homs southwards to Damascus (194 km) was opened in 1983
  Tartus-Latakia line in 1992
 Al Qamishli - Al-Yaarubiyah (- IRR Iraq, out of use)
 Damascus - Sheikh Miskin - Dera'a: under construction, to replace a section of Hejaz railway
 Sheikh Miskin - Suwayda (under construction)
 Palmyra - Deir ez-Zor - Abu Kemal (- IRR Iraq) (planned)

Current proposals 

Prior to the war there was a proposal for a connection with Iraq between Deir ez-Zor and Al Qa’im. However, all international routes operated by Syrian Railways were suspended due to the outbreak of the Syrian Civil War. 

The restoration of the rail link with Iraq (IRR) and the proposal to extend the railway from Al-Qaim in Iraq through Al-Bukamal in Syria to Homs for a total distance of 270 kilometers and thence to Tartus are as of 2022 under discussion.

Trackage 
These were the figures prior to the ongoing Syrian conflict:
 total: 
 standard gauge:   gauge
 narrow gauge:   gauge (2000) Chemin de Fer de Hedjaz Syrie

Operations 

The network is designed wholly around diesel-electric traction. For operational purposes CFS is divided into three regions: Central, Eastern and Northern. At the end of 2004 CFS employed around 12,400 staff.

The system has a low level capacity, with top speed usually limited. Operational train speed is also limited by a lack of interlocked signalling, with most of the system operating by informal signalling. The Damascus al-Hijaz railway station, which lies in the city centre, is no longer operational, and the railway connections with other cities depart from the suburban station of Qadam.

The result is that most passenger traffic has moved to air-conditioned coaches, and freight traffic dominates the operational trackage. The 2005 introduction of South Korean-built DMUs, where drivers were trained using a simulator, on the Damascus - Aleppo route, and the high traffic Aleppo - Latakia route where intermediate stations are bypassed, resulted in higher usage and occupancy levels.

The only remaining section of narrow gauge line, running from a point on the outskirts of Damascus into Jordan, is operated by Hedjaz Jordan Railway.

International connections 
The only international connection was with Turkey, but that link was halted due to the Syrian Civil War. The link with Iraq, severed in the war of 2003, was restored for a time but closed again; there was a plan to reopen it in June 2009. In 2008 it was proposed to open a joint rolling stock factory with Turkish State Railways at Aleppo.

Background on trains from Istanbul to Syria:  A brief history of the Taurus Express:

Agatha Christie wrote the first part of her novel Murder on the Orient Express during her stay in room 203 in Baron Hotel in Aleppo.
The novel doesn't start in Istanbul, or on the Orient Express.  It opens on the platform at Aleppo, next to the two blue-and-gold Wagons-Lits sleeping cars of the Taurus Express bound for Istanbul.  The Taurus Express was inaugurated in February 1930 by the Compagnie Internationale des Wagons-Lits, the same company that operated the Orient Express and Simplon Orient Express, as a means of extending their services beyond Istanbul to the East.  It ran several times a week from Istanbul Haydarpaşa station to Aleppo and Baghdad, with a weekly through sleeper to Tripoli in Lebanon.  After the second world war, the Wagons-Lits company gradually withdrew and operation of the Taurus Express was taken over by the Turkish, Syrian and Iraqi state railways.  Up until the late 1980s, a twice-weekly Istanbul-Baghdad service was maintained, with weekly through seating cars from Istanbul to Aleppo.  For political reasons, the through service to Baghdad was suspended and the main train curtailed at Gaziantep, but the weekly through seat cars Istanbul-Aleppo were maintained.  In 2001, the Aleppo portion of the Toros Express was speeded-up and given a proper Syrian sleeping-car instead of the two very basic Turkish seat cars.  You could once again travel in the security and comfort of a proper sleeper from Istanbul to Syria, and it was a great way to go.

Rolling stock

Current

Motive power

The motive power in 2009 was noted as:

Passenger vehicles 

The railway possessed:
 Passenger carriages: almost all OSShD-Y obtained mainly from the former Deutsche Reichsbahn of German Democratic Republic, the newest of which were obtained from Căile Ferate Române of Romania and Polish State Railways. 

 The stock of 483 carriages includes: 19 restaurant, 45 sleepers and 33 baggage vans. In 2001, Iranian company Wagon Pars refurbished some stock which is still in use, while the remaining unused stock lie rotting in sidings.

Freight wagons 

 Goods wagons: freight trains are organised into block workings, covering shipments of: oil, natural gas, phosphates, grain, cement, containers, construction materials and other transports. Most of 4319 vehicles were built between 1960–1975, with the most modern stock the grain wagons imported from Iran in the early 1990s. Approximate figures for stock:
 1294 Heavy Flat wagons
 846 Open wagons
 818 Oil tankers
 762 Covered wagons
 597 Grain wagons
 323 Phosphate wagons
 178 Sliding wall wagons
 146 Self unloading wagons
 53 Flat wagons
 50 Natural gas tankers
 45 Cement wagons
 20 Water tankers
 19 Tippers

Retired

See also 
 List of town tramway systems in Asia
 List of countries by rail transport network size
 Arab Mashreq International Railway
 Hejaz railway
 Hedjaz Jordan Railway
 Damascus–Amman train
 Aleppo railway station
 Transport in Syria
 Rail transport in Lebanon
 OTIF

References

External links 

 UN Map

Rail transport in Syria
Railway companies of Syria
Government-owned companies of Syria
Aleppo
Standard gauge railways in Syria
1050 mm gauge railways in Syria
Ottoman railways